Cradock may refer to:

People
Christopher Cradock (1862–1914), admiral in the Royal Navy
Edward Cradock (fl. 1571), English theologian and alchemist
Eric Cradock (d. 1985), Canadian stockbroker and sports entrepreneur 
Fanny Cradock (1909–1994), British writer, restaurant critic and television cook
Frederick Cradock, George Cross recipient, for heroism in his attempts to save a workmate from boiling steam in 1943 in Suffolk
H. C. Cradock, born Augusta Whiteford in 1863, an English children's book writer
John Cradock (alias Craddock) (c.1708–1778), English churchman, Church of Ireland Archbishop of Dublin from 1772
John Francis Cradock, 1st Baron Howden GCB (1759–1839), British peer, politician and soldier
Johnnie Cradock (1904–1987), British cook, writer, broadcaster and Army Major
John Francis Cradock (later Caradoc) (1762–1839), 1st Baron Howden, army officer  
John Hobart Cradock (later Caradoc) (1799–1873), 2nd Baron Howden, diplomat
Johnnie Cradock (1904–1987), British cook, writer, broadcaster and Army Major
Marmaduke Cradock (1660–1716, also Luke Cradock), English painter of birds and animals
Matthew Cradock, first governor of the Massachusetts Bay Company
Percy Cradock (1923–2010), British diplomat
Steve Cradock (b. 1969), guitarist for the British rock group Ocean Colour Scene
Stuart Cradock (b. 1949), English cricketer.
Walter Cradock (c. 1606–1659), Welsh Anglican clergyman
William Cradock (Archdeacon of Lewes) (fl. 1512–1516), English pre-Reformation priest
William Cradock (Dean of St Patrick's) (1741–1793), English Anglican priest, Archdeacon of Kilmore

Places
Cradock, Eastern Cape, a town in South Africa
Cradock, South Australia
Cradock Channel, connecting the Hauraki Gulf with the Pacific Ocean
Cradock Historic District, located at Portsmouth, Virginia, named after Christopher Cradock

See also
Caradog (disambiguation)
Craddock (disambiguation)